Felicia Atkins (born 5 April 1937), passed on August 12, 2016, in Australia, was an Australian born model. She was Playboy magazine's Playmate of the Month for the April, 1958 issue. Her centerfold was photographed by Bruno Bernard and Bill Bridges.

Felicia Atkins was a showgirl at the Tropicana Resort & Casino in Las Vegas, in their Las Vegas rendition of the "Folies Bergère", which is how she was discovered by Playboy. (The Playboy issue Atkins was featured in had a Las Vegas, Nevada theme.) Atkins holds the record for the longest tenure in the Tropicana's long-running Folies-Bergère revue (19 years).  She was the maid of honor at the marriage of Phillip Crosby, son of Bing Crosby, to fellow Tropicana showgirl Sandra Drummond, whilst she was dating Phillip's brother Gary Crosby.

See also
 List of people in Playboy 1953–1959

References

External links
 

1950s Playboy Playmates
1937 births
Living people